Aldudes is a commune in the Pyrénées-Atlantiques department in the Nouvelle-Aquitaine region in southwestern France.

It is located in the former province of Lower Navarre.

The inhabitants of the commune are known as Aldulais or Aldudar.

Geography

Location
The village Aldudes is part of Le Pays Quint (Kintoa in Basque or Quinto Real in Spanish). The commune is an area of pasture belonging to Spain but cultivated by French farmers.
 
It is located in the Aldudes valley on the banks of the Nive des Aldudes in the Basque province of Lower Navarre. It is on the Spanish border some 20 km southwest of Saint-Jean-Pied-de-Port although it can not be directly accessed from there.

Access
Access is by the D948 road from Saint-Etienne-de-Baigorry in the north, which passes through the village then continues south to Urepel. The D58 road goes from the village through the length of the commune before continuing to Spain through Urepel commune. The Spanish border of Navarre forms the southwestern and northeastern borders of the commune.

Hydrography
Located in the watershed of the Adour, Aldudes is traversed by the Nive d'Aldudes  with its many tributaries, such as the Urbeltch Labiaringo erreka, the Aktieltako erreka, and numerous unnamed streams. Paul Raymond mentioned the Autrin, a stream which rises in Aldudes and joins the Nive des Aldudes.

Localities and hamlets

 Abanjo
 Abrakou
 Achtieta
 Aguerréa
 Ahadilépo
 Alachontro
 Alamontcho
 Alasta
 Alastagaraya
 Ametzlépo
 Antonénéa
 Aranbelea
 Arrokia
 Asketa
 Atabala
 Aucho
 Autrin
 Auzkia
 Barbachuri
 Baztanchuria
 Behorsubuztan
 Berha
 Bidartea
 Chabadinénéa
 Chalosa
 Chekalebeherea
 Chekalegaraya
 Chiloénéa
 Chotro
 Chotroenborda
 Domingoénéa
 Egnauténéa
 Elgartéa
 Elhocady
 Elichaga
 Erremedio
 Errienta
 Esnazu (or Eznazu, or Esnaratsu on the Cassini Map)
 Etcheberria
 Etchemendia
 Ferranjagaraya
 Hachketa
 Haritzchilo
 Harribeltzia
 Iguxkagerrea (or Iguchkaguerrea)
 Joanessénéa
 Joangnakei
 Koche
 Koskartéa
 Koskarteko Borda
 Koskorziloa
 Landart
 Lechaka
 Lekuederra (or Lekuederrea)
 Col de Lepeder
 Luichénéa
 Mahatcheta
 Makurea
 Manechuna
 Marquitchaénéa
 Martinénéa
 Mate
 Meharroztegui (Pass, 738m))
 Menementa
 Miguelartzaina
 Miguelénéa
 Munichta
 Munichtagaraya
 Murruoin
 Nobléa
 Oliopitchar
 Otsachar
 Ohhanburua
 Otsanhaitz
 Oyhanzelhaya
 Paratzelhaï
 Patchiko
 Pilaria
 Pocomotzénéa
 Poko
 Le Pont Romain
 Predotinéa
 Premundoa
 Pritchia
 Sabina
 Salaria
 Sallaberria
 Sarahandia
 Sarahandiko Ithurria
 Sarkindéa
 Semeder
 Soldadoénéa
 Ttattola
 Turrieta
 Uhaldéa
 Urrichka
 Zelhaybeguia

Toponymy
The name of the commune in Basque is Aldude. Aldudes was also the name given to the entire valley bordering the Baigorry Valley and the Spanish border.

Jean-Baptiste Orpustan proposes the construction ald(a)-uhide meaning "the path beside the water".
According to Ernest Nègre however, the name Aldudes is a contraction of the basque Aldubide meaning "way to the summits" from the root aldu meaning "heights" and bide meaning "way". The romanisation into Aldudes is actually a plural.

The following table details the origins of the commune name and other names in the commune.

Sources:
Orpustan: Jean-Baptiste Orpustan,   New Basque Toponymy
Mérimée: Ministry of Culture Mérimée database: Presentation of the Commune),
Raymond: Topographic Dictionary of the Department of Basses-Pyrenees, 1863, on the page numbers indicated in the table. 

Origins:
Camara: Titles of Camara de Comptos

History
The commune originated in the 16th century when young noblemen of the Baigory family founded the village which, by the ancient Basque succession rule, reserved the legacy of the family house exclusively to the eldest child. The parish was established in 1793.

Heraldry

Administration

List of Successive Mayors

Inter-communality
The commune of Aldudes participates in five intercommunal organisations:
the Communauté d'agglomération du Pays Basque
the intercommunal association for the development and management of the slaughterhouse of Saint-Jean-Pied-de-Port
the joint association of the watershed of the Nive
the association to support Basque culture
the energy association of Pyrénées-Atlantiques

Population

Economy

A fish farm is active on the road to Urepel.

Basque pig breeding is an activity in full revival in the Aldudes valley, under the leadership of the Technical Institute of Pork (ITP).
 
The commune hosts the Ets Pierre Oteiza company (gourmet pork products) which is one of the fifty top agribusinesses in the department.

It is part of the Appellation d'origine contrôlée (AOC) zone of Ossau-iraty.

Culture and heritage

Languages
According to the Map of the Seven Basque Provinces, published in 1863 by Prince Louis-Lucien Bonaparte, the dialect of Basque spoken in Aldudes is western Lower Navarrese dialect.

Laxoa
In 1952 the square in front of the church and the town hall was converted into a playing field for "laxoa". This ancient game of basque pelote is played with leather gloves.

At the entrance porch of the church is the target for the game.

Civil heritage
The commune contains a number of sites that are registered as historical monuments:
Houses and Farms (18th-19th century)
The Menementa Farm (1827)
The Iguxkagerrea Farm (18th century)
The Joalginenborda Farm (19th century)

Other sites of interest
Cromlechs: There are three Harrespils on the Argibel site. These are great circles of stone or "menhirs" for funerary purposes, dated from the 1st millennium BC. The Harrespil are notable due to their number (over 100 registered) and their witness to knowledge of ancient burial rites.

Religious Heritage
The commune has two religious sites that are registered as historical monuments:
The Chapel of the Assumption (1868) at a place called Eznazu has been listed on the Inventory of cultural heritage since 21 March 2003. It contains a Retable and Statues (17th century) which are registered as historical objects.
The Parish Church of Notre-Dame (17th century) has a rosary which belonged to the Emperor Maximilian.

Other religious sites of interest
Some Hilarri in the cemetery are from the 19th century - two from 1805.

Environmental heritage
Palombière is the property of the association of the Baigorry Valley. This hunt at 500 metres above sea level was created in 1840 by the mayor of the town, Charles Schmarsow. Reorganized in 1880, it then passed into the hands of the Ospital family who still lead the hunt. The five Filetiers use five pantières'' or special nets and ten beaters to direct the pigeons to the nets.

Picture Gallery

Facilities

Education
The commune has a private primary school (Mendi-Alde).

Notable People linked to the communeGeorges Lacombe, born 31 January 1879 in Orthez and died July 1947 in Paris, was a linguist, bascologuue, and Basque French academic. On the eve of the First World War he prepared, with the help of Dr. Jean Etchepare, a doctorate in Letters on the Aldudes dialect.Bernard Delhom, born in 1885 in Aldudes, was the oldest man in France from 30 December 1995 to 7 February 1996 when he died in Paris at the age of 110 years and 213 daysJean-Baptiste Urrutia''', born in 1901 at Aldudes and died in Montbeton, was a missionary in Indochina and Bishop of Huế during the Indochina War and the Vietnam War

See also
Communes of the Pyrénées-Atlantiques department
Cantons of the Pyrénées-Atlantiques department
Arrondissements of the Pyrénées-Atlantiques department

Notes

References

External links
Aldude in the Bernardo Estornés Lasa - Auñamendi Encyclopedia (Euskomedia Fundazioa) 
les Aldudes on the 1750 Cassini Map

Communes of Pyrénées-Atlantiques
Lower Navarre